Wynyard School was a boarding school in Watford, Hertfordshire, England.

It was attended by C.S. Lewis (from September 1908 until June 1910) and his brother Warren.  Lewis' vivid account of the miseries he suffered there does not seem to have been exaggerated.  The discipline
was so severe, even by the standards of the time, that the family of one pupil took a High Court  action for assault, which appears to have destroyed the school financially.

Soon after the school closed, the headmaster suffered a breakdown and was committed to an insane asylum.

Another attendee of the school was Arthur William Barton, who became Archbishop of Dublin. Lewis recalled that he and Barton attended the headmaster's funeral and shared the wish that they would never meet him again in any future life.

Notes

Defunct schools in Hertfordshire